Magnolia Cemetery is a historic cemetery located at Hartsville, Darlington County, South Carolina.  It was established in 1917, and is a 23-acre cemetery characterized by narrow and gently curving streets and by landscaping which includes an avenue of cedars lining the entrance drive and magnolias lining the streets which form the historic core of the cemetery. The historic portion, approximately 14.5 acres, includes approximately 2,000 graves dating from about 1920 to the mid-20th century.

It was named to the National Register of Historic Places in 1994.

Notable interments
 Louis Norman "Bobo" Newsom (1907–1962), Major League Baseball Player

References

External links
 

Cemeteries on the National Register of Historic Places in South Carolina
1917 establishments in South Carolina
Geography of Darlington County, South Carolina
National Register of Historic Places in Darlington County, South Carolina
Buildings and structures in Hartsville, South Carolina